The 2006 AFC Challenge Cup Final was a football match that took place on 16 April 2006 at the Bangabandhu National Stadium in Dhaka to determine the winner of the 2006 AFC Challenge Cup.

Route to the final

Match

See also
 2006 AFC Challenge Cup

Notes

References

Final
AFC Challenge Cup Finals
Tajikistan national football team matches
Sri Lanka national football team matches
2006 in Tajikistani football
2005–06 in Sri Lankan football
April 2006 sports events in Asia